Mark Fletcher is an American entrepreneur. He was the founder and CEO of the news aggregator website, Bloglines, and the Vice President of Ask.com until June 2006. Ask Jeeves acquired Bloglines on 8 February 2005.

On September 23, 2014 Fletcher launched Groups.io in beta.

In February 2005, Fletcher won one of the annual Rave Awards, presented by Wired magazine, for the success of Bloglines. Fellow nominees in the Tech Innovator category were Internet entrepreneur Jimmy Wales, Adam Curry, Scott Maccabe, and Zhang Zuoyi. 

Previously, Fletcher started the free mailing list service ONElist. ONElist merged with eGroups, which was later acquired by Yahoo! in June 2000 and is now called Yahoo! Groups. Fletcher was also a software engineer at internet appliance maker Diba, Inc., now owned by Sun Microsystems, and at Pixel, Inc.

Fletcher has invested in One True Media, Plaxo, Techdirt and Wesabe

Fletcher obtained a Bachelor of Science degree in Computer Science from the University of California, San Diego.

Footnotes

External links
wingedpig.com (Fletcher's weblog)

American computer businesspeople
American technology chief executives
American technology company founders
Angel investors
IAC (company) people
Living people
University of California, San Diego alumni
Yahoo! people
Year of birth missing (living people)